The 1999 CAF Champions League Final was a football tie held over two legs in November and December 1999. Raja CA of Morocco beat ES Tunis of Tunisia on penalties after their two-legged tie ended goalless.

Qualified teams
In the following table, finals until 1996 were in the African Cup of Champions Club era, since 1997 were in the CAF Champions League era.

Venues

Stade Père Jégo

Stade Père Jégo is a multi-purpose stadium in Casablanca, Morocco. It is used mostly for football matches and is the home ground of Racing Casablanca.

The stadium currently holds 10,000 spectators.

Raja CA was forced to play the first leg og the final match on this stadium, due to the start of renovation at Mohammed V Stadium in view of Morocco's bid for the organization of the 2006 FIFA World Cup, green and red seats were installed on the side stands limiting its capacity to 45,891 seats without counting South (Magana) and North (Frimija) turns which have no seat.

Stade El Menzah

Stade Olympique El Menzah is a multi-purpose stadium, located in the north of Tunis, Tunisia.

It is built to host the 1967 Mediterranean Games at the same time as the Olympic swimming pool and gymnasium. Since then, it is an integral part of Tunisia's main sports complex. Tunisia's three major football teams, ES Tunis, Club Africain and Stade Tunisien played their games there.
The stadium is completely renovated for the 1994 African Cup of Nations. It has a capacity of 39,858 seats. The VIP section consists of a grandstand and 2 salons that can accommodate 300 people in a "cocktail" configuration.

Road to final

Format
The final was decided over two legs, with aggregate goals used to determine the winner. If the sides were level on aggregate after the second leg, the away goals rule would have been applied, and if still level, the tie would have proceeded directly to a penalty shootout (no extra time is played).

Matches

First leg

Second leg

References
 

Final
1999
Raja CA matches
November 1999 sports events in Africa
December 1999 sports events in Africa
Caf Champions League Final 1999